Top Boy (A Selection of Music Inspired by the Series) is an original soundtrack album for the British television series Top Boy. It was released on 13 September 2019 by OVO Sound and Warner. The soundtrack includes appearances from OVO's Drake, Baka Not Nice, and Popcaan and British artists AJ Tracey, Avelino, Dave, Fredo, Ghetts, Headie One, Little Simz, M Huncho, Nafe Smallz and SL.

Background
In November 2017, it was announced that Netflix would revive the television series, with season 3 executive produced by Drake's DreamCrew. On 7 July 2018, Drake appeared on Link Up TV's segment "Behind Barz", releasing a freestyle. On 10 November 2019, Dave released the official music video for "Professor X", directed by Nathan James Tettey.

Track listing
Credits adopted from AllMusic.

Certifications

References

2019 soundtrack albums
Television soundtracks
OVO Sound albums
Warner Records albums